Quarterly Literary Review Singapore (QLRS) is a Singapore online literary journal founded and edited by Singaporean poet Toh Hsien Min in 2001.

Overview
The first issue of QLRS appeared in October 2001. The journal is an online publication and is structured as a non-profit volunteer collective, and publishes poetry, short stories, essays, criticism and interviews, among others, from writers in Singapore and abroad. Besides Toh, the magazine's editorial team includes or has included other Singapore writers such as Heng Siok Tian, Cyril Wong, Yong Shu Hoong and Yeow Kai Chai.  The journal has published work by writers such as Leonard Schwartz, John Tranter, John Mateer, Arthur Yap, Wena Poon, Tania De Rozario, Desmond Kon and Kirby Wright.

See also
List of literary magazines

References

External links
 Quarterly Literary Review Singapore

2001 establishments in Singapore
Magazines established in 2001
Online literary magazines
Quarterly magazines
Singaporean literature
Magazines published in Singapore